"Brave" is a song by Swedish singer Hanna Ferm. The song was performed for the first time in Melodifestivalen 2020, where it made it to the final. "Brave" peaked at number 5 on the Swedish single chart.

Charts

References

2020 singles
2020 songs
English-language Swedish songs
Melodifestivalen songs of 2020
Songs written by Jimmy Jansson
Songs written by Laurell (singer)